Goodenia leiosperma  is a species of flowering plant in the family Goodeniaceae and is endemic to the Northern Territory. It is an ascending to low-lying herb with egg-shaped to lance-shaped stem-leaves and racemes of yellow flowers.

Description

Taxonomy and naming
Goodenia leiosperma was first formally described in 1990 by Roger Charles Carolin in the journal Telopea from specimens collected by George Chippendale south of Darwin in 1961.

Distribution and habitat
This goodenia grows in forest in the Victoria River district and Arnhem Land in the Northern Territory.

Conservation status
Goodenia leiosperma is classified as "least concern" under the Northern Territory Government Territory Parks and Wildlife Conservation Act 1976.

References

leiosperma
Flora of the Northern Territory
Plants described in 1990
Taxa named by Roger Charles Carolin